Mrs. Zeinab Kamel Ali is a Djiboutian politician and a member of the standing committee for the African Union's Economic, Social and Cultural Council representing Eastern Africa.

References

Economic, Social and Cultural Council Standing Committee members
Djiboutian women in politics
Living people
21st-century women politicians
Year of birth missing (living people)